Established by music industry professionals Jeremy Lascelles and Robin Millar, Blue Raincoat Music began as an artist management company based in West London in 2014. In 2016, the company diversified into music publishing, starting Blue Raincoat Songs. Later that year Blue Raincoat Music bought Chrysalis Records, an agreement which saw the label returned to the independent sector and reunited with original co-founder Chris Wright, in a new non-executive chairman role. In 2017, Blue Raincoat Music acquired the Berlin-based booking agency Spar-ks. Blue Raincoat Music now serves as the umbrella company under which Blue Raincoat Artists (management), Blue Raincoat Songs (publishing), and Chrysalis Records operate.

In August 2019, Blue Raincoat was acquired by Reservoir Media Management.

Managed artists
 Celebration
 Christian Lee Hutson
 Cigarettes After Sex
 J.S. Ondara
 Miss Grit
 Nova Twins
 Phoebe Bridgers

Published artists
 Abisha
 AKA George
 Cabbage (band)
 Francesca Lombardo
 Jack McManus (singer)
 Jalen N'Gonda
 Malena Zavala
 Martin Craft
 Mike Chapman
 Nadia Reid
 Nerina Pallot
 Portrait
 Rickie Lee Jones
 The Wandering Hearts
 Ruarri Joseph (William The Conqueror)

References

External links
Official site

Talent agencies
Music publishing companies of the United Kingdom